The software industry includes businesses for development, maintenance and publication of software that are using different business models, mainly either "license/maintenance based" (on-premises) or "Cloud based" (such as SaaS, PaaS, IaaS, MBaaS, MSaaS, DCaaS etc.). The industry also includes software services, such as training, documentation, consulting and data recovery. The software and computer services industry spends more than 11% of its net sales for Research & Development which is in comparison with other industries the second highest share after pharmaceuticals & biotechnology.

History
The first company founded to provide software products and services was Computer Usage Company in 1955. Before that time, computers were programmed either by customers, or the few commercial computer vendors of the time, such as Sperry Rand and IBM.

The software industry expanded in the early 1960s, almost immediately after computers were first sold in mass-produced quantities. Universities, government, and business customers created a demand for software. Many of these programs were written in-house by full-time staff programmers. Some were distributed freely between users of a particular machine for no charge. Others were done on a commercial basis, and other firms such as Computer Sciences Corporation (founded in 1959) started to grow. Other influential or typical software companies begun in the early 1960s included Advanced Computer Techniques, Automatic Data Processing, Applied Data Research, and Informatics General. The computer/hardware makers started bundling operating systems, systems software and programming environments with their machines.

When Digital Equipment Corporation (DEC) brought a relatively low-priced microcomputer to market, it brought computing within the reach of many more companies and universities worldwide, and it spawned great innovation in terms of new, powerful programming languages and methodologies. New software was built for microcomputers, so other manufacturers including IBM, followed DEC's example quickly, resulting in the IBM AS/400 amongst others.

The industry expanded greatly with the rise of the personal computer ("PC") in the mid-1970s, which brought desktop computing to the office worker for the first time. In the following years, it also created a growing market for games, applications, and utilities. DOS, Microsoft's first operating system product, was the dominant operating system at the time.

In the early years of the 21st century, another successful business model has arisen for hosted software, called software-as-a-service, or SaaS; this was at least the third time this model had been attempted. From the point of view of producers of some proprietary software, SaaS reduces the concerns about unauthorized copying, since it can only be accessed through the Web, and by definition no client software is loaded onto the end user's PC.

Size of the industry
The global software products market amounts to US$968.25 billion in 2021 and had a compound annual growth rate (CAGR) of 4%. Major companies include Microsoft, HP, Oracle, Dell and IBM.

Mergers and acquisitions
The software industry has been subject to a high degree of consolidation over the past couple of decades. Between 1995 and 2018 around 37,039 mergers and acquisitions have been announced with a total known value of US$1,166 billion. The highest number and value of deals was set in 2000 during the high times of the dot-com bubble with 2,674 transactions valued at US$105 billion. In 2017, 2,547 deals were announced valued at US$111 billion. Approaches to successfully acquire and integrate software companies are available.

Business models within the software industry
Business models of software companies have been widely discussed. Network effects in software ecosystems, networks of companies, and their customers are an important element in the strategy of software companies.

See also
Software development company
 Software engineering
 World's largest software companies
 Function point
 Software development effort estimation
 Comparison of development estimation software

References

External links

 

 
Industries (economics)
Information economy